Vauxhall is a town in southern Alberta, Canada that is surrounded by the Municipal District of Taber. It is situated in the prairie land between Bow River and Oldman River.

Vauxhall is known as the "Potato Capital of the West."

Demographics 

In the 2016 Census of Population conducted by Statistics Canada, the Town of Vauxhall recorded a population of 1,222 living in 413 of its 458 total private dwellings, a  change from its 2011 population of 1,288.

Infrastructure 

Education 
The Town of Vauxhall is served by two schools, Vauxhall High School and Vauxhall Elementary School.

Geography

Climate 

Like much of southern Alberta, Vauxhall experiences a semi-arid climate (Köppen climate classification BSk). In winter the community is prone to a Chinook wind which blows off the Rocky Mountains. This can bring periods of extremely warm temperatures relative to what would normally be seen at that time of year.

See also 
List of communities in Alberta
List of towns in Alberta

References

External links 

1949 establishments in Alberta
Towns in Alberta